State Attorney Jordan is a 1926 German silent film directed by Karl Gerhardt and starring Hans Mierendorff, Hedwig Pauly-Winterstein, and Paul Henckels. It was shot at the Weissensee Studios in Berlin. The film's sets were designed by the art directors Ernst Schütte and Erich Zander. It premiered at Berlin's Marmorhaus.

Cast

See also
 State Attorney Jordan (1919 film)

References

Bibliography

External links 
 

1926 films
Films of the Weimar Republic
German silent feature films
Films directed by Karl Gerhardt
Remakes of German films
German black-and-white films
Films based on German novels
Films produced by Joe May
Phoebus Film films
1920s German films
Films shot at Weissensee Studios